Paracoryza is a genus of beetles in the family Carabidae, containing the following species:

 Paracoryza canaliculata Balkenohl, 2000
 Paracoryza incribra Balkenohl & Schüle, 2005
 Paracoryza insulana Basilewsky, 1973
 Paracoryza mahnerti Balkenohl, 2000
 Paracoryza parvusulcata Balkenohl & Schüle, 2005
 Paracoryza taitensis Balkenohl & Schüle, 2005

References

Scaritinae